Tomb of Torture is a 1963 Italian gothic horror film. It was the only film directed by Antonio Boccacci.

Production
Tomb of Torture was the only film directed by Antonio Boccacci. Prior to making the film, Boccacci wrote cheap paperback mystery novels in the late 1950s. The film was shot in Castle Orsini  in Nerola near Rome. The cast included Annie Alberti who was a minor photonovel star in the early 1960s.

Release
Tomb of Torture was released in Italy on 27 March 1963 where it was distributed by Filmar. Italian film historian and critic Roberto Curti stated that the film passed totally unnoticed in Italy where the "box office  takings were so scarce that there is no actual record of them."

The film was picked up for distribution in the United States by Richard Gordon and was released by Trans-Lux Distributing on a double bill with the German vampire film Cave of the Living Dead. Tomb of Torture was later purchased by Four Star for television releases. The film has been released by Image Entertainment on DVD in the United States.

Reception
In retrospective reviews, Bryan Senn discussed the film in his book A Year of Fear, stating that the film as a "deadly dull Italian snoozefest" that has none of "atmospheric charm or thematic richness" that Cave of the Living Dead had. Louis Paul, in his book Italian Horror Film Directors described the film as obscure and noted it was "photographed in an almost experimental style, which includes a concentration on a lot of sepiatoned colors" that tinted scenes in "bright blues and garish browns". Paul concluded the film to be "more than just the mean-spirited horror movie that it appears to be" and the film "still remains an enigmatic footnote in the history of Italian horror."

See also
 List of horror films of 1963
 List of Italian films of 1963

References

Footnotes

Sources

External links
 

Gothic horror films
1963 horror films
1963 films
Italian horror films
1960s Italian films